Marion John Fricano (July 15, 1923 – May 18, 1976) was an American Major League Baseball pitcher. He is likely remembered for throwing the pitch that ended Cass Michaels' career on August 27, .

U.S. Navy
The ,  right-hander was born in Brant, New York, and raised in nearby North Collins. He briefly attended Cortland State University before enlisting in the United States Navy, and serving as a radio operator in the Amphibious Unit during World War II.

Early years
Fricano spent five seasons in the Dodgers' farm system, compiling a 66–33 record and 3.24 earned run average when his contract was purchased by the Philadelphia Athletics early in the  season. He went 17–8 with a 2.26 ERA for the Triple-A Ottawa A's to earn a call up to Philadelphia that September. Fricano made two appearances out of the bullpen, pitching a total of five innings, and allowing just one earned run. He earned his first major league win against the Detroit Tigers on September 12.

Philadelphia Athletics
The following Spring, Fricano impressed A's manager Jimmy Dykes enough to earn himself a bullpen job for the start of the  season. He made five relief appearances (all in losses) before making his first start in the second game of a May 22 doubleheader with the Boston Red Sox. After surrendering a first inning home run to Hoot Evers, Fricano held the Sox scoreless. The score was tied at one when Fricano led off the eighth with a double, then stole third. He came around to score the go-ahead run on Eddie Robinson's sacrifice fly. The lead, however, did not last, as the A's bullpen allowed a ninth inning run to send the game into extra innings.

He was even better in his second start, also against the Red Sox. Fricano allowed one run, a solo home run by center fielder Tom Umphlett in the ninth inning, on his way to the complete game victory. His heroics with the bat also continued. His second inning single drove (coincidentally) Cass Michaels home with the A's second run of the game.

The 1953 A's finished seventh of eight American League teams in runs scored (only the St. Louis Browns were worse) on their way to 95 losses. Hence, Fricano's 9–12 record is not indicative of how well he pitched. His 3.88 ERA was tops on his team, he was second on the Athletics' staff (and ninth overall in the A.L.) in innings pitched (211), and pitched ten complete games.

Fricano's fortunes reversed in 1954. After losing his first start of the season, he was moved into the bullpen. He ended up splitting his time fairly evenly between starts and relief appearances. Facing the Washington Senators on August 23, he was cruising along, having allowed just one hit into the fifth inning. After a two out walk to Eddie Yost the Senators followed with three consecutive singles to take a 3–1 lead. He ended up losing the game, and seeing his record fall to 5–9, and his ERA rise to 5.17.

$150 fine
Fricano hoped to bounce back in his next start, against the Chicago White Sox, but was again the victim of one big inning. Jim Rivera hit a bases clearing triple to give the Chisox a 5–0 lead in the third inning when Cass Michaels stepped to the plate. The first pitch out of Fricano's hand nailed Michaels in the temple. Michaels was hospitalized after the pitch, and his season was ended. He tried to come back the following spring, but after collapsing during Spring training, called it a career at just 28 years old. After surrendering a home run to the following batter, Johnny Groth, which brought the score to 8–0, manager Eddie Joost pulled him from the game.

Fricano made his next appearance out of the bullpen, and hit opposing pitcher Steve Gromek of the Detroit Tigers. Gromek, who hit A's batter Bill Wilson in the fourth inning, and had a reputation as a head hunter himself (12 hit batsmen in 1954), charged the mound. Both players were ejected from the game, and fined by the league.

Last hurler in Philadelphia's American League history
In , Fricano had far more success as a reliever than starter. He went 4–11 with a 6.13 ERA as a starter, but was 1–0 with two saves and a 2.72 ERA out of the bullpen. On Sunday, September 26, 1954, the closing day of the Athletics' nightmarish, 103-loss campaign, Fricano took the mound at Yankee Stadium in he sixth inning in relief of Art Ditmar; the bases were loaded, with one out, and Philadelphia was clinging to a 6–4 lead. Fricano proceeded to throw a wild pitch, bringing the Yankees to within a run. He then issued an intentional walk to Mickey Mantle to re-load the bases, but set up a double play. Facing another Baseball Hall of Famer, Yogi Berra, Fricano induced Berra to bounce into a 3–6–3 twin-killing to end the inning and preserve the Athletics' lead. Philadelphia went on to win the contest, 8–6, with Fricano going the distance and getting credit for a save.

The contest turned out to be the cash-starved Athletics' last in Philadelphia's 54-year-old American League history. A complicated process that included an 11th-hour bid by Philadelphia interests to buy the Athletics ultimately saw Connie Mack's legendary franchise sold to industrialist Arnold Johnson and moved to Kansas City, Missouri, in the autumn of 1954. 

In , the A's found themselves in a new city with a new manager. Kansas City skipper Lou Boudreau used Fricano strictly out of the bullpen. His success as a reliever continued, however, Boudreau seemed to lack faith in Fricano. Despite a 0.82 ERA, Fricano had only been used in lopsided losses. Facing the New York Yankees on July 23, Fricano allowed two inherited runners to score, but did not allow an earned run of his own to bring his ERA to a season low of 0.77.

He pitched again three days later; this time he was hit hard by the Washington Senators. Roy Sievers led off with a home run. This was followed by a triple, double and single, as the Senators completed a reversed natural cycle on their way to scoring four runs in the inning. He pitched one more inning unscathed, however, his ERA now stood at 3.29. He made three more appearances, all in losses, before he was optioned to the Triple-A Denver Bears never to pitch in the major leagues again.

Minor league career

Fricano became a well traveled minor leaguer. After the 1955 season, Fricano and $60,000 were sent to the unaffiliated Toronto Maple Leafs of the International League for fellow pitcher Jack Crimian. After the 1956 season, he was drafted by the Seattle Rainiers (Cincinnati Reds Pacific Coast League affiliate) in the minor league draft. During the  season, he was dealt to the Phoenix Giants for Max Surkont.

Career statistics
Major leagues

Minor leagues
Over thirteen minor league seasons, Fricano was 131–91 with a 3.39 ERA in 423 games pitched.

Post playing career
After his baseball career, Fricano returned to North Collins, where he served as Town Supervisor from 1962-1973. He earned his master's degree at the University at Buffalo. He became a school teacher, and later the recreation director at Gowanda State Hospital. He died from complications due to cancer at age 52 while on vacation in Tijuana. The Town of North Collins, New York dedicated The Marion J. Fricano Memorial Town Park in his honor.

References

External links

1923 births
1976 deaths
Baseball players from New York (state)
Cortland Red Dragons baseball players
Dallas Rangers players
Deaths from cancer in Mexico
Denver Bears players
Indianapolis Indians players
Johnstown Johnnies players
Kansas City Athletics players
Major League Baseball pitchers
Memphis Chickasaws players
Mobile Bears players
Nashua Dodgers players
Ottawa A's players
Sportspeople from Erie County, New York
Phoenix Giants players
Philadelphia Athletics players
Pueblo Dodgers players
St. Paul Saints (AA) players
Seattle Rainiers players
Toronto Maple Leafs (International League) players
University at Buffalo alumni
Valdosta Dodgers players
United States Navy personnel of World War II
United States Navy sailors
American expatriate baseball players in Panama